The Meja Dam is one of the biggest dam of Bhilwara and famous for its green mount park. It is 20 km away from Bhilwara, Rajasthan, India.

This was the main source of drinking water for Bhilwara city as well as surrounding area. For Bhilwara city 62 tube wells have been installed in the submergence of dam but at present except for 10 tubewells all are almost dry. As per records shown by PHED, sufficient water was available till 1996. After 1996 the water receipt in the dam abruptly reduced. The design capacity of the dam is 2930 mcft and water received in 2007, 2008, 2009 was 140 mcft, 21 mcft, 31.67 mcft respectively.

The main reason could have been construction of a large number of small ponds in the catchment area of the dam without any planning or without catchment area management and monitoring. Principal Secretary, PHED informed that more than 27,000 anicuts has been constructed and 64 major and minor dams have been constructed over 8 streams in the district. Main flowing river in the district is Banas river which is dry due to less rainfall in the catchment and as a consequence large numbers of tube wells sunk in Kankroliya Ghati area could not get recharged sufficiently.

The dam has reportedly filled with 28.9 feet of water level in August 2016.

Salient features

References

Dams in Rajasthan
Dams completed in 1958
Bhilwara district
1958 establishments in Rajasthan
20th-century architecture in India